Wyndham Alleyn Daubeny Evanson (1851 in Llansoy, Monmouthshire – 30 October 1934) was an England international rugby union footballer.  He was the brother of Arthur Evanson, another England Rugby International.

Life
Evanson was educated at St John's School, Leatherhead and made his England debut in 1875 against Scotland. In total he played 5 times for England.

Evanson was also a fast runner and combined this with rowing, his crew winning the Grand Challenge Cup at Henley in 1881.  He was still a scratch golfer aged 61.

References

1851 births
1934 deaths
England international rugby union players
People educated at St John's School, Leatherhead
Rugby union players from Monmouthshire
Welsh rugby union players